Dvaravati art is a form of artistic work originating from Mon. Dvaravati flourished from the Dvaravati Mon ancient artifacts are in present-day Thailand and Burma, Mon states to the west in southern Myanmar (Burma) and with the Mon state in northern Thailand. Dvaravati experienced political domination by neighbouring peoples on three occasions: in the 10th century, when the Burmese conquered the Mon state of Thaton west of the Tenasserim Yoma; from the 11th to the 13th century, when the Khmer Empire (Cambodia) arose in the east; and finally, in the late 13th century, when Dvaravati was absorbed by the Thai empire.

History 

Dvaravati art came into form around the 6th century by the Mon communities as part of numerous minor kingdoms that existed in Thailand. Surrounding geography proved treacherous for travel and thus provided a fair amount of isolation for the individual kingdoms. Isolation enabled development of a highly sophisticated and distinct Mon-Dvaravati style.

Influence 
Dvaravati itself was heavily influenced by Indian culture though the process of cultural diffusion over several centuries starting from the Christian 5th century, and played an important role in introducing  Mahayana Buddhism and particularly Buddhist art to the region.

Architecture 
Archaeological research and restoration have indicated that Buddhist monuments of the Dvaravati style exhibited contemporary art of Gupta temple-architecture with many constructed with open-air structures. Chief among the architecture is the stupa style architecture.

There are four major categories: 
chedi with terrace in each story
 stupa with a square base 
The central part of this is pointed in a finial way.
stupa with a square base and a central part
This form is shaped in an inverted alms-bowl. This form has numerous superimposed flat rings with a bulb terminal. Inspired by Mahayana Buddhism.
stupa with a square base and 5 terraces.
The lowest is the biggest terrace while the smallest is the top terrace. Each terrace has 3 niches in each of the four direction. Inside these 3 niches stand Buddha images.

The temple complex at Wat Phra That Hariphunchai, dating to the 9th and 11th centuries, is a pristine example of Dvaravati architecture. 
Phra Pathommachedi is a wat dating to the 12th century that exemplifies the architecture.

Art
Various pottery excavated from former Dvaravati sites in central Thailand exhibit the sophistication and complexity of Dvaravati art.

Many Buddha statues were created with Dvaravati style. Some Buddha statues have mudras (hand positions) and others have katakahasta mudra (fingers folded down into palms, suggesting if it is holding something), both of which have evolved before 800 CE. Buddha statues are common artefacts.

Pottery
There are various kinds of Dvaravati pottery.
 Dish on stand;
These pots often have a polished reddish-brown colour with red or white alternating stripes.
Carinated pot
these pots come in a variety of colours such as red, orange, brown, and black, although the top part of these vessels are plain.
Shallow cup
These cups are used as lamps. They are made with a medium texture to a brown and gray finish. Most are handmade.
Spouted bowl
These bowls are used as candles and often are coarse in texture with a black brown or shiny black in colour. 
Globular pot
Jar with spout
There are two variations

Museums
Artifacts have been collected over the years. Many pristine examples of artifacts can be found in Thai museums such as the Phra Pathommachedi National Museum in Nakhon Pathom city and the Prachinburi National Museum in Prachinburi, Prachinburi, Thailand.

Gallery

References

Further reading

Brown, Robert. The Dvaravati Wheels of the Law and the Indianization of South East Asia. Leiden: Brill, 1996.
Gosling, Betty. Origins of Thai Art. Trumbull, Conn.: Weatherhill, 2004.
Indrawooth, Phasook. Index Pottery of Dvaravati Period Department of Archaeology, Silpakorn University, Bangkok, 1985

Dvaravati
Thai art
Art by period of creation
Buddhist art
Mon people